Nataliya Zhukova (born 29 March 1980) is a Kazakhstani volleyball player. She competed in the women's tournament at the 2008 Summer Olympics.

References

1980 births
Living people
Kazakhstani women's volleyball players
Olympic volleyball players of Kazakhstan
Volleyball players at the 2008 Summer Olympics
Sportspeople from Almaty
Asian Games medalists in volleyball
Volleyball players at the 2002 Asian Games
Volleyball players at the 2006 Asian Games
Volleyball players at the 2010 Asian Games
Medalists at the 2010 Asian Games
Asian Games bronze medalists for Kazakhstan